Saskia Sills (born 24 July 1996 in Plymouth) is a world champion British windsurfer and member of the British Sailing Team. She has continued to compete in international events such as the European championships, and has been part of the British Sailing team from 2013 to present as a windsurfer initially in the RS:X (Women) Class, and more recently in the IQFoil class.

Debut
Sills started sailing in 2004 at Roadford Lake sailing club. She won the World Championship title at age 13, and continued on to win it again on her 15th birthday. She won it twice when she was aged 16. She also received the Young Sailor of the Year award in 2012 at the London International Boat Show from YJA.

Current campaign
Saskia, and her twin Imogen live in Portland where they train at the Weymouth and Portland National Sailing Academy.

Awards
Nominated for BBC Young Sports Personality of the Year in 2012, Saskia was chosen for her gold in the ISAF Youth World Championship and at the EUROSAF Youth Europeans, continuing on to claim the under-17 world title at the RSX Open Youth World Championships. She was nominated alongside Olympic and Paralympic medalists for the ISAF Rolex World Sailor of the Year Awards.

Her Bournemouth University awards received include University Colours and a nomination for Sportswoman of the Year.

References

1996 births
Living people
English windsurfers
People from the Isle of Portland
English female sailors (sport)
Sportspeople from Dorset
Twin sportspeople
English twins
Alumni of Bournemouth University